In Greek mythology, Thespia (Ancient Greek: Θέσπια) was the daughter of the river-god, Asopus and Metope, daughter of Ladon, also a river-god. Thespiae (the city west of Thebes) was named after her.

Mythology 
They say that Thespia was a daughter of Asopus, who gave her name to the city, while others say that Thespius, who was descended from Erechtheus, came from Athens and was the man after whom the city was called.

Note 

Naiads
Nymphs
Children of Asopus

References 

 Pausanias, Description of Greece with an English Translation by W.H.S. Jones, Litt.D., and H.A. Ormerod, M.A., in 4 Volumes. Cambridge, MA, Harvard University Press; London, William Heinemann Ltd. 1918. . Online version at the Perseus Digital Library
 Pausanias, Graeciae Descriptio. 3 vols. Leipzig, Teubner. 1903.  Greek text available at the Perseus Digital Library.